Grandes y pequeños hombres del Plata is a 1864 Argentine book written by Juan Bautista Alberdi. It is a harsh criticism of the books Historia de Belgrano y de la Independencia Argentina by Bartolomé Mitre and Facundo by Domingo Faustino Sarmiento.

1864 non-fiction books
Argentine non-fiction books
Literary criticism